John Macartney may refer to:
John Ellison-Macartney (1818–1904), Irish barrister and politician
 John Arthur Macartney (1834–1917), British colonist, squatter and grazier 
Sir John Macartney, 1st Baronet (died 1812), MP for Naas and Fore in Parliament of Ireland
Sir John Macartney, 3rd Baronet (1832–1911), of the Macartney baronets
Sir John Barrington Macartney, 6th Baronet (1917–1999), of the Macartney baronets
Sir John Ralph Macartney, 7th Baronet (born 1945), of the Macartney baronets

See also
John McCartney (disambiguation)